The Șimleu Mountains is a mountain range in Transylvania, Romania, which belongs to the Apuseni Mountains.

References

External links
 

Mountain ranges of the Western Romanian Carpathians
Western Romanian Carpathians
Geography of Sălaj County